La Princesse de Clèves is a 1961 French-Italian drama film based on the 1678 novel of the same name.

Cast
 Marina Vlady – La princesse de Clèves
 Jean Marais – Le prince de Clèves
 Jean-François Poron – Jacques, Duke of Nemours
 Henri Piégay – Le vidame de Chartres
 Annie Ducaux – Diane de Poitiers
 Lea Padovani – Catherine de' Medici

References

External links
 

1960s historical drama films
French historical drama films
Italian historical drama films
Cultural depictions of Catherine de' Medici
Films based on works by Madame de La Fayette
Films directed by Jean Delannoy
Films scored by Georges Auric
Films with screenplays by Jean Cocteau
Films set in the 16th century
1961 drama films
1961 films
1960s French films
1960s Italian films